Spy File (subtitled The Best of V. Spy V. Spy) is the first greatest hits album by Australian rock band Spy vs. Spy. It was released in 1991 and peaked at number 85 on the ARIA charts in 1992.

It includes tracks from the band's 1984 EP Meet Us Inside and first four studio albums.

Track listing

Charts

Release history

References

1991 albums
Compilation albums by Australian artists
Spy vs Spy (Australian band) albums